Terry Hershey Park is a county park that runs parallel to a roughly  stretch of the Buffalo Bayou in western Houston, Texas. The park is named after Terry Hershey, a conservationist who campaigned to keep the banks of Buffalo Bayou from being paved.  The park hosts a network of trails that run along the bayou from State Highway 6 to the Sam Houston Tollway and is a popular destination for local residents, runners, bicyclists and Geocachers.

Bike trails

The park maintains a network of both paved asphalt paths and dirt  trails along the bayou. The paved walkways are located in the cleared stretch of the park, free of trees, and are about 10 feet in width. The dirt trails, however, cut through the densely grown forest growing along the bayou, and are not easily accessible.

As of August 2020, e-bikes and other electric/battery powered transportation are prohibited on the trails. Per State Law, Texas Transportation Code Sec. 551.106(a), e-bike prohibition is only valid on dirt trails. E-bike is still allowed on paved trails where operation of non-electric bicycles is permitted.

The park promotes its signature bike trails, the "Anthills", on its website.

Neighborhoods along the park
Neighborhoods are listed from east to west.

| width="30%" align="left" valign="top" style="border:0"|
Bordering the park to the north:
 Memorial Bend
 Memorial Glen
 Gaywood
 Memorial Trails
 Wilchester
 Wilchester West
 Yorkshire
 Woodbend in Memorial
 River Forest
 Memorial Drive Acres
 Nottingham Forest
 Ashford Forest
 Westchester
 Park on Memorial Apartments
 Turkey Creek Townhomes
 Meadows on Memorial
 Thornwood
 Promenade Memorial
 Village on Memorial Townhomes
 Memorial Thicket
 Marywood
 Oaks of Fleetwood Townhomes
 Fleetwood
| width="30%" align="left" valign="top" style="border:0"|
Bordering the park to the south:
 Briargrove Park
 Creekstone Apartments
 Walnut Bend
 Lakewood Forest
 Lakeside Place Apartments
 Epernay
 Woods of Lakeside
 Heathwood
 Ashford Forest
 Ashford Lakes Apartments
 Wildwood Cluster Homes
 Shepherd Trace
 Provident Oaks
 Lake at Stonehenge
 Briarforest
 Parkway Village
 Oaks of Parkway
 Briar Hills

References
Terry Hershey Park - Harris County Precinct 3 Parks

External links
 Harris County Precinct 3 website
 Terry Hershey Park website
 Briarhills website
 Briar Forest Super Neighborhood website

Parks in Houston